Designer Music is the third album by American disco act Lipps, Inc., and the last featuring Cynthia Johnson on lead vocals. It was released in 1981 on Casablanca Records.

The tracks "Hold Me Down" along with the title track became a hit in 1981 peaking at number eleven on the American dance chart. While the song "Designer Music" failed to catch real attention in American dance charts, it made a lasting imprint in the Mexican and Philippine Disco scenes during the early 1980s as it was a certified disco smash hit and is a staple in discos being held at any part of the country.

Track listing

Side one
 "Designer Music" – 5:40
 "Hold Me Down" – 5:25 
 "The One" – 3:42
 "The One After" – 2:10

Side two
 "Everybody Knows" – 4:36 
 "I Need Some Cash" – 4:57 
 "Background Singer" – 2:23
 "Things Take Time" – 3:51

Personnel 

Cynthia Johnson – lead vocals
Roger Dumas – synthesizer
Terry Grant – bass
Steven Greenberg – synthesizer, bass, drums, keyboards
Scott Jones – keyboards, vocals
Ivan Rafowitz – synthesizer, keyboards
André Cymone – vocals
Rockie Robbins – vocals
Melanie Rosales – vocals
Robert Schnitzer – guitar
Bobby Vandell – drums

Certifications

References

Lipps Inc. albums
1981 albums
Casablanca Records albums